Chennamangaloor, also spelt as Chennamangallur and/or Chendamangallur is a village located in Kozhikode district, Kerala, India. The National Institute of Technology Calicut (NITC), the Indian Institute of Management Kozhikode (IIM-K), K.M.C.T. are located near to Chennamangallur.

Notable people
O Abdurahiman, journalist and author, Group Editor Madhyamam and Media One TV
Hameed Chennamangaloor, social critic
O Abdulla Journalist, Social Critique, Writer 
CT Abdurahim, writer and educator

PT Kunjali, Writer, orator

External links
CMR on Web
Iruvazhinji
CMR
Islahiya Association
Media Academy
Sayanora Computer Academy
Chaithanya Samskarika V

Kozhikode east